Émile Labussière (2 May 1853 — 21 February 1924) was a French politician.

He was member of the Radical-socialiste Party and served as mayors of Limoges from 1889 to 1892. He was a deputy for Haute-Vienne in 1910. He was appointed treasurer-pay general in Reunion on 1906.

Biography
Émile Labussièrew was born in Bénévent-l'Abbaye, France on 1853 and died in Perpignan, France on 1924 at the age of 70.

References 

1853 births
1924 deaths
People from Creuse
Members of the 6th Chamber of Deputies of the French Third Republic
Members of the 7th Chamber of Deputies of the French Third Republic
Members of the 8th Chamber of Deputies of the French Third Republic